Adolfo Schlegel (born 2 August 1900, date of death unknown) was a Chilean athlete. He competed in the men's pole vault at the 1936 Summer Olympics.

References

1900 births
Year of death missing
Athletes (track and field) at the 1936 Summer Olympics
Chilean male pole vaulters
Olympic athletes of Chile
Place of birth missing